Weliander Silva Nascimento (born 6 August 1984 in Três Corações, Minas Gerais), is a Brazilian footballer who plays for Duque de Caxias as a midfielder.

References

External links

1984 births
Living people
Brazilian footballers
Association football midfielders
CR Vasco da Gama players
Duque de Caxias Futebol Clube players
Associação Desportiva Recreativa e Cultural Icasa players
Vitória F.C. players
Primeira Liga players
Brazilian expatriate footballers
Expatriate footballers in Portugal